Victor Boin (28 February 1886 – 31 March 1974) was a Belgian freestyle swimmer, water polo player, and épée fencer who competed at the 1908, 1912 and 1920 Summer Olympics.

Olympics
Boin was part of the Belgian water polo teams that finished second in 1908 and third in 1912. In 1908 he also participated in the 100 metre freestyle swimming competition, but was eliminated in the first round.

As a fencer he finished fourth in the individual épée competition in 1912. In 1920 he was eliminated in the first round of the individual épée event, but won a silver medal in the team épée event.

Boin took the first ever Olympic Oath at the 1920 Games in Antwerp, where he was also the Belgium flag bearer at the Opening Ceremony. Later, between 1955 and 1965, he served as president of the Belgian Olympic Committee.

Other activities
Boin was also active in ice skating, flying, ice hockey, and motorcycle racing. In 1903, aged 17, he founded the first Belgian ice hockey club and became its first president.

Boin worked as a sports journalist, theater critic and sports official. In 1912 he founded the Belgian Professional Association of Sports Journalists, and headed it from 1923 to 1935. In 1924 he co-founded the International Sports Journalists' Association; he served as its first vice-president, and later became its president.

During World War I he joined the Belgian Air Force, eventually becoming the personal pilot of Queen Elisabeth.

See also
 Belgium men's Olympic water polo team records and statistics
 List of Olympic medalists in water polo (men)

References

Bibliography
 
 Wallechinsky, David and Jaime Loucky (2008). The Complete Book of the Olympics - 2008 Edition. London: Aurum Press, Limited. pp. 607, 1050.

External links
 
 

1886 births
1974 deaths
Sportspeople from Brussels
Belgian sports journalists
Belgian male freestyle swimmers
Belgian male water polo players
Belgian male fencers
Belgian épée fencers
Swimmers at the 1908 Summer Olympics
Water polo players at the 1908 Summer Olympics
Water polo players at the 1912 Summer Olympics
Fencers at the 1912 Summer Olympics
Fencers at the 1920 Summer Olympics
Olympic swimmers of Belgium
Olympic water polo players of Belgium
Olympic fencers of Belgium
Olympic silver medalists for Belgium
Olympic bronze medalists for Belgium
Olympic medalists in fencing
Olympic medalists in water polo
Medalists at the 1908 Summer Olympics
Medalists at the 1912 Summer Olympics
Medalists at the 1920 Summer Olympics
Oath takers at the Olympic Games
20th-century Belgian people